Beer Sheva Park is a small park located on Lake Washington in the Rainier Beach neighborhood of Seattle, Washington. Dedicated in 1905 as Atlantic City Park after the subdivision, it was renamed after Beer Sheva, Israel, in 1977, to honor Seattle's new sister city. In Beer Sheva, Israel, a "Seattle Park" was made in honor of Seattle's gesture.

External links

Seattle Department of Parks and Recreation

Parks in Seattle
Rainier Beach, Seattle

he:פארק באר שבע (סיאטל)